TSHS may refer to
 The Seven Hills School, Cincinnati, Ohio, United States
 Tahoma Senior High School, Covington, Washington, United States
 Tarpon Springs High School, Pinellas County, Florida, United States
 Terry Sanford High School, Fayetteville, North Carolina, United States
 Toowoomba State High School, Toowoomba, Queensland, Australia
 Twin Springs High School, Nickelsville, Virginia, United States